Jan Schust (born 30 December 1978, Hamburg) is a German author, founder and affiliate marketer.

Career 
In 2001, Schust founded the schust.media Internetmarketing GmbH, which was renamed Tarifcheck24 in 2003. In 2009, He resigned as CEO but is still a strategic consultant to the company. In 2010, his website wechseln.de was transformed into the Check24 Affiliate AG and he founded affiliate-deals.de. In the same year he returned as CEO of Tarifcheck24. He bought 100partnerprogramme.de in 2015 and founded the Super Affiliate Network GmbH, as parent for 100partnerprogramme.de, affiliate-deals.de and affiliate-people.de. In 2016, Tarifcheck24 changed its name to tarifcheck.de. The affiliate-travel program „Mit Jan Schust Nach“ ("with Jan Schust to.."), in which he took winners of a competition and entrepreneurs who share their knowledge on trips to various destinations, was run between 2014 and 2019.
  
Schust is also a consultant for IT-companies and startup investor and has written a bestselling book about affiliate marketing. His book is a resource for university courses, such as the Affiliate Marketing course at the FH Kufstein. As of 2022, tarifcheck is the third most popular website for comparing insurances.

Publications 
 Schust, J. (2017): „Jetzt zum eigenen Einkommen im Internet: Grundlagen, Methoden und Expertentipps - Affiliate Marketing”,

References

External links 
 Official website

1978 births
Living people